Concord Coach may refer to:

Concord Coach Lines, an intercity bus company
Concord coach, a horse-drawn vehicle often used as a stagecoach

See also  
Concord (disambiguation)